Nenzing is a market town in the district of Bludenz in the Austrian state of Vorarlberg with a population of 6.225 (2022).

Population

Education
There are 5 kindergarten, 4 primary schools and there is one secondary modern school in Nenzing.

Politics 
Florian Kasseroler from the Freedom Party of Austria is the mayor of Nenzing since 2003.

References

Cities and towns in Bludenz District